Mt. Meridian Schoolhouse is a historic one-room school building located at Mt. Meridian, Augusta County, Virginia. It was built in 1886, and is a one-story, rectangular frame building with a gable roof.  By 1890, the school had been enlarged to two rooms, which was later removed. The school closed in 1908.

It was listed on the National Register of Historic Places in 1985.

References

One-room schoolhouses in Virginia
School buildings on the National Register of Historic Places in Virginia
School buildings completed in 1886
Schools in Augusta County, Virginia
National Register of Historic Places in Augusta County, Virginia